Sumargad is a less visited fort in Ratnagiri district. This fort lies east of the Khed. There are no human settlements around the fort. There are two ways to reach Sumargad one; is from Mahipatgad and the other one from Rasalgad. The trek to this fort is through remote forest area. Very less history is known about this fort.

The fort has steep cliffs on all the sides. It is a very small fort, with fortification over an area of 1–2 acres. There are many rock cut water cisterns on the fort. Only two cisterns have clear potable water. There is a cave on the fort with Shivalinga. From the top of fort Mahipatgad, Rasalgad, Chakdev and Parvatgad are seen.

References

Forts in Maharashtra
Ratnagiri district
Forts in Ratnagiri district